Heinrich Gottfried Otto Richard von Vietinghoff genannt Scheel (6 December 1887 – 23 February 1952) was a German general (Generaloberst) of the Wehrmacht during World War II. He was a recipient of the Knight's Cross of the Iron Cross with Oak Leaves. Vietinghoff commanded the German troops in German-occupied Italy in 1945.

Military career
On 24 November 1938, Vietinghoff was appointed commander of the 5th Panzer Division and took part in the invasion of Poland under Wilhelm Ritter von Leeb. He was promoted to General in June 1940 after which he led the German XLVI Panzer Corps in the invasion of Yugoslavia.

During Operation Barbarossa, his Corps was part of Army Group Centre under Field Marshal Fedor von Bock. As all commanders of the German corps on the Eastern Front during the invasion, Vietinghoff implemented the criminal Commissar Order. Vietinghoff also later served with General Heinz Guderian in the 2nd Panzer Army.

From December 1941 to August 1943, he was Commander-in-Chief of the German Fifteenth Army in France. In Italy from August 1943 he commanded German Tenth Army, which was responsible for the delaying actions through the successive defensive lines built across Italy. Notable in this context were the defences on the Winter Line from November 1943 to May 1944 and the fighting in the autumn of 1944 on the Gothic Line. 

In October 1944, he was temporarily raised to overall command in Italy (Army Group C) when Field Marshal Albert Kesselring was seriously injured in a car crash. In January 1945, on Kesselring's return, he left Italy to command Army Group Courland in East Prussia. When Kesselring was moved in March 1945 to command German Army Command West (OB West) in France, Vietinghoff returned as the supreme German commander in Italy.

At the end of April 1945, he made contact with the Allied forces and on 29 April, his representative General Karl Wolff  signed on his behalf at the Royal Palace in Caserta the instrument of surrender on 2 May 1945 at noon. Afterwards he spent two and a half years in British captivity at Bridgend Island Farm (Special Camp XI) among high-ranking German prisoners. He was released in September 1947.

After the war Vietinghoff was a member of the expert group dealing with the question of German rearmament. In October 1950 he wrote the Himmerod memorandum, named after the Himmerod Abbey where it was written, on behalf of the Adenauer government, on West German contributions to European defence. He died on 23 February 1952 in Pfronten.

Military awards

 Prussian Iron Cross (1914) 1st Class (23 April 1915) & 2nd Class (13 September 1914)
 Clasp to the Iron Cross (1939) 1st Class (28 September 1939) & 2nd Class (21 September 1939)

 Knight's Cross of the Iron Cross with Oak Leaves
 Knight's Cross on 24 June 1940 as General der Panzertruppe and commanding general of XIII. Armeekorps
 456th Oak Leaves on 16 April 1944 as Generaloberst and commander-in-chief of the 10. Armee
 German Cross in Gold - 22 April 1942 as General der Panzertruppe and commanding general of the XXXXVI Panzerkorps

References

Citations

Bibliography

 
 
 
 
 

1887 births
1952 deaths
Military personnel from Mainz
People from Rhenish Hesse
Colonel generals of the German Army (Wehrmacht)
Prussian Army personnel
German Army generals of World War II
German Army personnel of World War I
Recipients of the Gold German Cross
Recipients of the Knight's Cross of the Iron Cross with Oak Leaves
Recipients of the Hanseatic Cross (Lübeck)
Officers of the Order of Military Merit (Bulgaria)
German prisoners of war in World War II held by the United Kingdom
Recipients of the clasp to the Iron Cross, 1st class
Himmerod meeting participants
Reichswehr personnel
Heinrich von Vietinghoff